Manuel Uquillas (born 19 November 1968) is an Ecuadorian former professional footballer. He played in six matches for the Ecuador national football team from 1991 to 1996. He was also part of Ecuador's squad for the 1991 Copa América tournament. He was the top scorer in the Ecuadorian Serie A in 1994 and 1995.

References

External links
 

1968 births
Living people
Ecuadorian footballers
Ecuador international footballers
Place of birth missing (living people)
Association football forwards
Sportspeople from Guayaquil
Ecuadorian Serie A players